The Graves is a 2009 horror film. Described as a "supernatural survival shocker," it is written and directed by veteran comic book creator Brian Pulido and produced by Mischief Maker Studios, and  Ronalds Brothers Productions.

Plot
Present day. Arizona. Megan and Abby Graves are inseparable sisters that couldn't be less alike. Megan just graduated ASU with a marketing degree. She's a self-assured, naturally attractive rock chick with a black belt that she likes to use. Abby just barely graduated high school. She's a cute, Hot Topic Goth who's caustic and afraid of her own shadow. They share one thing: a life-long obsession with comics and pop culture. Simply put, they are beautiful geeks. In a few days, Megan will start a new job in New York. To send her off in style, the sisters go on a wild, pop culture bender that includes a trip to uncharted Arizona in search of a kitchy roadside attraction. Instead, Megan and Abby happen on Skull City Mine, a weather-beaten, abandoned mine town converted into a self-guided tour. But Skull City harbors terrible, vexing secrets. It appears to be haunted. Its caretakers are murderous. Victims' souls are ripped from their bodies right before their eyes, and that's only the beginning. When Megan suffers a near mortal wound, Abby must save her sister, but to do so, she must unlock the mystery of Skull City alone. Can Abby defeat the threats of Skull City and rescue Megan or are they doomed like all the other tourists before them?

Cast

Premise
The Graves is the debut film of independent comic book creator, Brian Pulido (Lady Death, Evil Ernie).

It features performances by genre vets Bill Moseley (The Devil's Rejects), Amanda Wyss (A Nightmare on Elm Street) and Tony Todd (Candyman), female leads, played by Clare Grant (Masters of Horror: "Valerie on the Stairs") and Jillian Murray (The Fun Park) and the debut of D. Randall Blythe (front man, Lamb of God).

Production
The principal photography was shot on location in the Sonoran Desert near Wickenburg, Arizona over the course of 4 weeks and the project has entered post-production. The real-life Vulture City Mine and ghost town was used as the setting for the film.

Release
The film ran at 8 Films to Die For IV and premiered there on January 29, 2010.

References

External links
 
  
 

2009 films
2000s English-language films
2000s supernatural horror films
American supernatural horror films
Films shot in Arizona
Films set in Arizona
2000s American films